The Journal of the American Academy of Psychiatry and the Law is a quarterly academic journal published by the American Academy of Psychiatry and the Law. It was established in 1969 and until 1997 was titled Bulletin of the American Academy of Psychiatry and the Law.

References

External links 

 

Quarterly journals
American law journals
Medical law journals
English-language journals
Publications established in 1969
Psychiatry journals